José Luis Zelaye (born 17 December 1978) was an Argentinian footballer.

Honours

Player
Palestino
 Primera División de Chile (1): Runner-up 2008 Clausura

Individual
 Primera División de Chile Best Centre Back (1): 2008

References
 Profile at BDFA 

1978 births
Living people
Argentine footballers
Argentine expatriate footballers
Club Atlético Independiente footballers
San Martín de San Juan footballers
San Martín de Mendoza footballers
C.S. Cartaginés players
Club Atlético Banfield footballers
Aldosivi footballers
Club Deportivo Palestino footballers
C.D. Huachipato footballers
Expatriate footballers in Chile
Expatriate footballers in Costa Rica
Association football defenders
Sportspeople from Mendoza Province